Valentin is a male given name.

Valentin or Valentín may also refer to:

Valentin (surname), a surname
Valentin Taifun, biplane of the modern German Valentin Flugzeug company
Valentin (grape), another name for the Austrian wine grape Roter Veltliner
Vermentino, another wine grape with Valentin as a synonym   
The Nazi Germany code name for the Valentin submarine pens
Valentín, a 2002 Argentine film

See also 
 Saint Valentin (disambiguation)
 Valentina (disambiguation)
 Valentine (disambiguation)
 Valentini (disambiguation)
 Valentino (disambiguation)